In Canada, Stabilization payments are budgetary payments made to compensate Canadian farmers for falling farm prices and/or incomes.  Stabilization programs include insurance or safety nets or underwriting schemes intended to compensate farmers for decreases in price, income or cash flow due to disturbances to yields (from drought, for example) or instability of input and commodity markets.

References 

Agriculture in Canada